In the field of fluid dynamics, a convection cell is the phenomenon that occurs when density differences exist within a body of liquid or gas. These density differences result in rising and/or falling currents, which are the key characteristics of a convection cell. When a volume of fluid is heated, it expands and becomes less dense and thus more buoyant than the surrounding fluid. The colder, denser part of the fluid descends to settle below the warmer, less-dense fluid, and this causes the warmer fluid to rise. Such movement is called convection, and the moving body of liquid is referred to as a convection cell. This particular type of convection, where a horizontal layer of fluid is heated from below, is known as Rayleigh–Bénard convection. Convection usually requires a gravitational field, but in microgravity experiments, thermal convection has been observed without gravitational effects.

Fluids are generalized as materials that exhibit the property of flow; however, this behavior is not unique to liquids. Fluid properties can also be observed in gases and even in particulate solids (such as sand, gravel, and larger objects during rock slides).

A convection cell is most notable in the formation of clouds with its release and transportation of energy. As air moves along the ground it absorbs heat, loses density and moves up into the atmosphere. When it is forced into the atmosphere, which has a lower air pressure, it cannot contain as much fluid as at a lower altitude, so it releases its moist air, producing rain. In this process the warm air is cooled; it gains density and falls towards the earth and the cell repeats the cycle.

Convection cells can form in any fluid, including the Earth's atmosphere (where they are called Hadley cells), boiling water, soup (where the cells can be identified by the particles they transport, such as grains of rice), the ocean, or the surface of the Sun. The size of convection cells is largely determined by the fluid's properties. Convection cells can even occur when the heating of a fluid is uniform.

Process
A rising body of fluid typically loses heat when it encounters a cold surface when it exchanges heat with colder liquid through direct exchange, or in the example of the Earth's atmosphere, when it radiates heat. At some point, the fluid becomes denser than the fluid beneath it, which is still rising. Since it cannot descend through the rising fluid, it moves to one side. At some distance, its downward force overcomes the rising force beneath it, and the fluid begins to descend. As it descends, it warms again through surface contact or conductivity and the cycle repeats.

Within the Earth's troposphere

Thunderstorms

Warm air has a lower density than cool air, so warm air rises within cooler air, similar to hot air balloons.  Clouds form as relatively warmer air carrying moisture rises within cooler air. As the moist air rises, it cools, causing some of the water vapor in the rising packet of air to condense.  When the moisture condenses, it releases energy known as the latent heat of vaporisation, which allows the rising packet of air to cool less than its surrounding air, continuing the cloud's ascension. If enough instability is present in the atmosphere, this process will continue long enough for cumulonimbus clouds to form, which support lightning and thunder.  Generally, thunderstorms require three conditions to form:  moisture, an unstable air mass, and a lifting force (heat).

All thunderstorms, regardless of type, go through three stages: a 'developing stage', a 'mature stage', and a 'dissipating stage'.  The average thunderstorm has a  diameter. Depending on the conditions present in the atmosphere, these three stages take an average of 30 minutes to go through.

Adiabatic processes
Heating caused by the compression of descending air is responsible for such winter phenomena as the chinook (as it is known in western North America) or the Föhn (in the Alps).

Within the Sun 
The Sun's photosphere is composed of convection cells called granules, which are rising columns of superheated (5,800 °C) plasma averaging about 1,000 kilometres in diameter. The plasma cools as it rises and descends in the narrow spaces between the granules.

References

External links
 Mountainnature.com — Chinook

Convection